Manduca incisa is a moth of the  family Sphingidae.

Distribution 
It is known from Brazil and Bolivia.

Description 
It is similar in appearance to several other members of the genus Manduca.

References

Manduca
Moths described in 1856